Alain Fabiani (born 14 September 1958) is a French volleyball player. He competed in the men's tournament at the 1988 Summer Olympics.

References

External links
 

1958 births
Living people
French men's volleyball players
Olympic volleyball players of France
Volleyball players at the 1988 Summer Olympics
Sportspeople from Algiers
21st-century Algerian people